The Cow Palace (originally the California State Livestock Pavilion) is an indoor arena located in Daly City, California, situated on the city's northern border with neighboring San Francisco. Because the border passes through the property, a portion of the upper parking lot is in San Francisco.

History
Completed in 1941, it hosted the San Francisco Warriors of the NBA from 1962 to 1964 and again from 1966 to 1971. The Warriors temporarily returned to the Cow Palace to host the 1975 NBA Finals as the Oakland–Alameda County Coliseum Arena was booked for an Ice Follies performance. It was the site of both the 1956 Republican National Convention and the 1964 Republican National Convention. During the 1960s and 1970s, the SF Examiner Games, a world-class indoor track and field meet, was held annually at the Cow Palace. The Cow Palace was also an important venue for professional boxing until the early 1980s, having staged regular shows, including ten world title fights and appearances of all-time greats like Joe Louis, Sugar Ray Robinson, and Alexis Arguello. Additionally it has hosted professional wrestling and the Bay Bombers of roller derby; the Derby's world championship playoffs were held at the Cow Palace every fall beginning from 1959 through 1973, when the organization was disbanded. From 1956 until 1999, the Ringling Bros. and Barnum & Bailey Circus visited the Cow Palace, joined in later years by what is now Disney on Ice; both events were later held at Oracle Arena, where Disney on Ice still plays since the demise of the Ringling Bros. organization.

The arena seats 11,089 for ice hockey and 12,953 for basketball. When the Warriors played there, its basketball capacity was just over 15,000. It has also been the home of the annual Grand National Rodeo, Horse & Stock Show since 1941 (except for a break from 1942 to 1945 due to World War II). The venue hosted the 1960 men's NCAA basketball Final Four and the 1967 NBA All-Star Game. Sesame Street Live has been held at the Cow Palace since the early 1980s, as has Champions on Ice. In recent years the Cow Palace has been the Bay Area stop for the Cirque du Soleil.

Behind the name
The idea for the arena was inspired by the popularity of the livestock pavilion at the 1915 Panama–Pacific International Exposition. 
A local newspaper asked, as early as May 1935, "Why, when people are starving, should money be spent on a 'palace for cows'?" A headline writer turned the phrase around, thus "Cow Palace".

During World War II
The arena opened in April 1941. During World War II, though, the arena was used for processing soldiers bound for the Pacific Theater. In the following years, it hosted hockey and basketball games, wrestling and boxing matches, concerts, roller derby and political events, most notably the 1956 and 1964 Republican National Conventions. The arena is still used for the Grand National Rodeo and other events.

Sports
The San Francisco Warriors of the National Basketball Association called the Cow Palace home from 1962 to 1964 and from 1966 to 1971. From 1964 to 1966, the Warriors played predominantly at the San Francisco Civic Auditorium. The franchise then moved across the bay to the new Oakland Coliseum Arena and changed their name to Golden State Warriors. In 2019, the Warriors moved to the Chase Center in San Francisco.

The Warriors lost to the Boston Celtics in the 1964 NBA Finals. The 1967 NBA Finals between San Francisco and the Philadelphia 76ers saw three games held at the Cow Palace. The two NBA Finals games hosted by the Warriors in their 1974–75 championship season were also held at the Cow Palace because of other events at the Oakland Coliseum.

On and off between 1975 and 1984, the San Jose/Golden Bay Earthquakes of the NASL played indoor soccer at the Cow Palace, including hosting the 1975 NASL indoor championship game, which they won 8–5 over the Tampa Bay Rowdies. The 'Quakes spent several seasons playing at the Oakland Coliseum Arena before splitting time between the two arenas for the 1983–84 NASL Indoor season.

The San Francisco Shamrocks (PHL) called the Cow Palace home from 1977 to 1979. They won the championship their first season, but ended up disbanding in January 1979 part way through their second season.

The Major Indoor Soccer League came to the Cow Palace for the 1980–81 season, when David Schoenstadt relocated his Detroit Lightning there, renaming them the San Francisco Fog. After a dismal season with an 11-29 record and less than five thousand fans per game, Schoenstadt moved the franchise again, this time to Kemper Arena in Kansas City, Missouri, where the team flourished as the Kansas City Comets.

It also hosted the San Jose Sharks of the NHL from 1991 to 1993 before the completion of their new home, the San Jose Arena. From 1991 to 1993, the Sharks sold out every game played at the building. It was one of the last buildings to house a smaller than NHL-regulation rink. The NHL had previously rejected the building in 1967 as a home for the expansion California Seals franchise, who instead played home games out of the Oakland–Alameda County Coliseum Arena.

San Jose lost their first game at the Cow Palace to the Vancouver Canucks 5-2 on October 5, 1991. Wayne Presley scored the first Sharks goal at the arena. Three nights later, San Jose won their first game in franchise history there, a 4–3 win over the Calgary Flames.

The Sharks' second season in the Cow Palace was highlighted by a 17-game losing streak and a league record 71 losses. The Sharks ended their run at the Cow Palace at the conclusion of the 1992–93 season with a 3–2 loss to eventual Campbell Conference champion Los Angeles on April 10, 1993. The team moved to the new San Jose Arena (now the SAP Center) to start 1993–94 after going 22-56-4 at their first home.

At the Cow Palace, the Sharks recorded the franchise's first win, shutout (Artūrs Irbe) and hat trick (Rob Gaudreau). The team also introduced their mascot, S.J. Sharkie, on the Cow Palace ice in mid-1992 when he climbed out of the front of a Zamboni. He later bungee-jumped from the rafters near the end of the first season.

In 1995, the IHL's San Francisco Spiders played their only season at the Cow Palace. Several players who played for the Sharks during their Cow Palace years suited up for the Spiders that year. Due to poor attendance, the team ceased operations at the end of the 1995–96 season.

The Palace has also hosted professional wrestling events under promoters, most notably Roy Shire, who ran cards there from the early 60s to 1981, oftentimes to sold-out houses headlined by Ray Stevens, Pat Patterson and others. After Shire ended operations, other promotions such as the WWF and WCW moved in. Notable cards included WCW's SuperBrawl in 1997, 1998, and 2000 and WWE's No Way Out in 2004. In 2018 the Cow Palace hosted New Japan Pro-Wrestling's G1 Special in San Francisco.

From 1974 to 1989, the Cow Palace was the site of the  Pacific Coast Championships, a yearly tournament on the men's professional tennis tour. Some of the biggest names in tennis played there, such as Jimmy Connors, John McEnroe and Ivan Lendl.

On December 7, 1992, the California Golden Bears featuring freshman guard Jason Kidd defeated the University of San Francisco Dons 89-79. On March 8, 1997, California defeated Arizona, 79-77. Future NFL Hall of Famer Tony Gonzalez scored 20 for California.

In 2010, the Cow Palace once again had a regular sports tenant when the American Indoor Football Association's San Jose Wolves kicked off. However, the next year they would move to Stockton as the independent Stockton Wolves.

On September 27, 2011, the ECHL formally announced that pro hockey would return to the Cow Palace after a 16-year hiatus with the arrival of the San Francisco Bulls the following fall. To accommodate the new team its ownership spent $2 million on renovating the team locker rooms, upgrading the concession stands, food improvements and installing new widescreen HD monitors to observe gameplay, installing a new ice system (as the old ammonia-based system that was in place for the Seals, Shamrocks, Sharks & Spiders had since become outdated and illegal) and a new custom-made wraparound LED video scoreboard with its game presentation system and ten sets of Custom Piston speakers from Claire Brothers Audio formerly used by AC/DC. The center hung video board has a 360° view for game presentation and full timekeeping and statistics. The new Colosseo Cube scoreboard – made by Colosseo USA – was custom built in order to agree with some of the weight bearing limitations for the roof. The engineers designed new structural steel beams and had them installed in the rafters to provide the additional support required. The Bulls folded on January 28, 2014, 40 games into their second season.

In 2020, the Cow Palace hosted a minor sports event in its walls, Sacred Heart Cathedral Preparatory versus its long time rival St. Ignatius College Preparatory.

On March 1 and 3, 2023, the Cow Palace will be hosting AEW Dynamite and AEW Rampage, leading into AEW Revolution, which will be hosted at the Chase Center in San Francisco.

Events

Politics
The Cow Palace twice hosted the Republican National Convention. Republicans gathered at the Cow Palace for the 1956 Republican National Convention to renominate Dwight D. Eisenhower for President and Richard Nixon for Vice President. The ticket won in a landslide.

The Republicans came back eight years later for the 1964 Republican National Convention at which Barry Goldwater was nominated for President and William Miller was nominated for Vice President. They lost to Lyndon Johnson and Hubert Humphrey, also in a landslide.

Concerts

Rodeos and livestock expositions

The Cow Palace is officially the 1-A District Agricultural Association, a State agency of the California Department of Food and Agriculture's Division of Fairs and Expositions. It has extensive stable and barn facilities for animal events, which are used for the annual Grand National Rodeo and occasionally for other events. It also used to host events on the now-defunct BRO (Bull Riders Only) tour.

Holiday events
In the weeks leading up to Christmas each year, the Cow Palace generally serves as the venue for the Great Dickens Christmas Fair, an event featuring food, vendors, and entertainment inspired by Charles Dickens' novels and Victorian era holiday traditions.

Media
In 1982, the Cow Palace stood in for the Houston Coliseum when the 1962 barbecue welcoming NASA to Houston was recreated for the movie The Right Stuff.
The explosion of the starship USS Reliant, used in the movie Star Trek II: The Wrath of Khan, was filmed in the Cow Palace auditorium. The pyrotechnic charge for the shot was suspended over the auditorium floor and the explosion was filmed from below.

Recent developments

In the spring of 2008, State Senator Leland Yee advanced legislation to allow Daly City to purchase the Cow Palace from the California Department of Food and Agriculture's Division of Fairs and Expositions in order to develop housing, basic amenities, and possibly a school for the surrounding area. However, the legislation was opposed by groups that regularly use the venue and other California citizens outside Daly City.

On September 9, 2008, Governor Arnold Schwarzenegger vetoed this proposed sale of the Cow Palace overflow parking lot. Following the 2008 publicity associated with Leland Yee's failed bill, the Cow Palace board of directors entered exclusive negotiations with Cypress Equities for a 60-year lease to develop the  proposed by Daly City.
Due to the lack of progress, this agreement was subsequently terminated and negotiations then commenced with a Marin County-based developer in early 2010.

U2 played again at The Cow Palace for a private concert in October 2016 for the annual Salesforce conference, "Dreamforce."

On July 7, 2018, New Japan Pro-Wrestling held their G1 Special in San Francisco event at the arena.

Notable commencement ceremonies
Starting in 2015, the Academy of Art University held its commencement ceremony at Cow Palace.

Location
The Cow Palace has a Daly City address, and except for the very northwest corner of the parking lot, which is across the San Francisco border, it lies entirely within Daly City. It is one mile away from the Sunnydale San Francisco MUNI Light Rail Station.

See also
List of convention centers in the United States
List of indoor arenas in the United States
List of rodeos

References

External links

Sports venues in San Mateo County, California
Convention centers in California
Indoor arenas in California
Daly City, California
Athletics (track and field) venues in San Francisco
Basketball venues in California
Big Time Wrestling (San Francisco)
Boxing venues in California
Indoor track and field venues in California
Indoor ice hockey venues in California
Indoor soccer venues in California
Music venues in the San Francisco Bay Area
Rodeo venues in the United States
Defunct National Hockey League venues
NCAA Division I men's basketball tournament Final Four venues
North American Soccer League (1968–1984) indoor venues
Wrestling venues in San Francisco
San Francisco Warriors venues
Agriculture in California
Sports venues in San Francisco
1941 establishments in California
Sports venues completed in 1941
Former National Basketball Association venues
Tennis venues in California
San Jose Sharks